Rallia Christidou (Greek: Ραλλία Χρηστίδου) is a popular Greek singer originating from Neo Irakleio, Athens. She started her studies in classic guitar and received a diploma from the National music school of Greece. Her name rose to fame when she took part in the second season of the television singing competition Fame Story in which she won the second place, just behind Kalomira, and a record deal with Heaven Music. Since then Rallia enjoyed some success in Greece and Cyprus becoming one of the best young artists. She made 7 albums, two of them platinum in Cyprus. In 2011 after a fight with Heaven Music, about her last album 'Stin apenanti plevra' and how it will be published, Rallia left the company not wanting to publish her new album along with a newspaper and published it with other label. 'Stin apenanti plevra' is her first album as a composer of all the songs, and as many say, the best album of her career till now, and one of the best in 2011. Rallia cooperated with the biggest names in Greek music such as Giannis Kotsiras and many others, becoming one of the most quality young voices in the Greek music industry.

Biography
Rallia Christidou was born and raised in Neo Herakleio of Attica, Greece. Her father`s origin is from Xanthi and her mother`s origin is from Kokkinia of Peireaus. Both her parents are from Asia Minor.

Rallia began classic guitar lessons at the age of 8 at the National Conservatory from which she graduated at the age of 22 with perfect grades, after which she continued her studies of higher musical theory.

Furthermore, during her school years at the Arsakeio Tositseio School of Ekali, from which she graduated in 1997, she became involved in the arts, by taking part in musical shows at the Herodeum of Attica and the Concert Hall of Athens.

In addition to her musical education, she has taken two and a half years of acting, performing and vocal lessons.

For six years, Rallia was a member of the semi-professional group called "Nastra", and she was a member of the Classical Choir "Marsippos" for two years.

Seven years ago, she was accepted into the television musical academy of ANT1, called Fame Story from which she gained accolades for her vocal ability.

At the conclusion of Fame Story, Rallia and some of the other performers began a series of live shows across Greece as the group" Fame Story Live".

In the winter of 2004-2005, she began her live professional music career next to Yiannis Kotsiras, Manolis Famellos and Melina Aslanidou. The shows began in Thessaloniki and continued in Athens.

In the summer of 2005, she gave concert performances next to Yiannis Kotsiras and Manolis Famellos throughout Greece. That summer Rallia also released her first album "Me to vlemma tis kardias" under the Heaven label which was produced by Kostas Kalimeris and Yiannis Kotsiras.

In the winter of 2005-2006 she performed in the newly opened music club "Anodos Peireaus" along with Yiannis Kotsiras, Eleni Tsaligopoulou and Manos Pyrovolakis.

Next, she gave a series of concerts with Eleni Tsaligopoulou and Andriana Babali. In the summer she accompanied Manolis Lidakis on a tour throughout Greece. In May of the same year, she released her second album called "Ena hadi zesto".

In November 15, 2007, Rallia began a series of performances called "kati allo" which means "something else" on the music stage of Stavros tou Notou Apenanti. These shows with the musicians Alexis Apostolakis, Fotis Siotas, Odysseas Galanakis, Kostas Giannaris and Christos Alexakis were very successful.

In February 2008 Rallia begins a number of shows at the same music club with Melina Aslanidou that continued until the beginning of the summer . Later that summer Rallia and Melina toured together throughout Greece.

In September of that year, Rallia released her first live album from her show at Stavros tou Notou Apenanti called "Mono mia nyhta live". In October the very successful duo Rallia-Melina began a new series of very successful live performances at the club of Stavros tou Notou Apenanti that ended in May 2009.

In the summer of 2009, Rallia began a tour with Yiannis Kotsiras and Myronas Stratis during which she released her fourth album under the Heaven label titled "Etimi" from which the singles "Pane tora meres" (duet with George Sambanis), "Exo vges", "Oti pligoni" and "mia zoi" had consistent airplay on the radio and later were made into videos.

In October 2009, she began live shows at the music club "Akti Peireaus" with Vasilis Papakonstantinou, Sakis Boulas, Lakis Papadopoulos and Giannis Zouganelis. In November, she gave a number of shows with Melina Aslanidou at the club "Milos" in Thessaloniki.

In the summer of 2010 she went on tour with Giannis Zouganelis and Lakis Papadopoulos.

In the winter of 2010-2011, she gave a number of live concerts in Greece and Cyprus. She also participated in the musical television show "Just the Two of Us" for charity.

In the summer of 2011, she performed several live shows with Christos Dantis.

In October 2011, Rallia returned to the club Stavros tou Notou Apenanti now called Stavros tou Notou Plus. She also released her fifth album under her own independent label called "Stin apenanti plevra". This album is exclusively available from the beam store www.heedia.com as a high quality audio download.

In December, she signed an exclusive contract with Sony Music that released her fifth album “Stin Apenanti plevra” in compact disk. Furthermore, she travelled to many different places all over Greece and Cyprus giving concerts with her three musicians playing piano, acoustic guitar, bouzouki, electric guitar and lute, this whole range of musical instruments, punctuated by drums and other percussions.

In May, Rallia Christidou hosted in Algeria under the 13th European cultural festival, a concert full of musical sounds representing Greece.

Discography
Mi Mou Les Andio [OST] (2004)
Me To Vlemma Tis Kardias (2005)
Gia Tin Anna [OST] (2006)
Ena Hadi Zesto (2007)
Live: Mono Mia Nihta (2008)
Etoimi (2009)
Stin Apenanti Plevra (2012)
Me oplo tin agapi (2013)

References

External links
Official website
MAD TV biography

1979 births
Living people
Arion Music Awards winners
Greek entehno singers
21st-century Greek women singers
MAD Video Music Awards winners
Singers from Athens
Syriza politicians
Greek MPs 2019–2023